This page includes a list of biblical proper names that start with R in English transcription. Some of the names are given with a proposed etymological meaning. For further information on the names included on the list, the reader may consult the sources listed below in the References and External Links.

A – B – C – D – E – F – G – H – I – J – K – L – M – N – O – P – Q – R – S – T – U – V – Y – Z

R

Raamah
Raamiah
Rabbah
Rabbi
Rabbith
Rabboni
Rabmag
Rab-saris
Rabshakeh
Raca
Racal
Rachab
Rachal
Rachel
Raddai
Ragau
Raguel
Rahab
Rahab
Rakal
Raham
Rakem
Rakkath
Rakkon
Ram
Ramah
Ramath
Ramathaim-Zophim
Ramath-lehi
Ramath-mizpeh
Ramiah
Ramoth
Raphah
Reaiah
Reba
Rebekah
Rechab
Reelaiah
Regem
Regemmelech
Rehabiah
Rehob
Rehoboam
Rehoboth
Rehum
Rei
Rekem
Remaliah
Remmon
Remphan
Rephael
Rephaiah
Rephaim
Rephidim
Resen
Reu
Reuben
Reuel
Reumah
Rezeph
Rezin
Rezon
Rhegium
Rhesa
Rhoda
Rhodes
Ribai
Riblah
Rimmon
Rinnah
Riphath
Rissah
Rithmah
Rizpah
Rogelim
Rohgah
Romamti-ezer
Roman
Rome
Rosh
Rufus
Ruhamah
Rumah
Ruth

References
Comay, Joan, Who's Who in the Old Testament, Oxford University Press, 1971,  
Lockyer, Herbert, All the men of the Bible, Zondervan Publishing House (Grand Rapids, Michigan), 1958
Lockyer, Herbert, All the women of the Bible, Zondervan Publishing 1988, 
Lockyer, Herbert, All the Divine Names and Titles in the Bible, Zondervan Publishing 1988,  
Tischler, Nancy M., All Things in the Bible: An Encyclopedia of the Biblical World, Greenwood Publishing, Westport, Conn. : 2006

Inline references 

R